In telecommunications, packet switching is a method of grouping data  into packets that are transmitted over a digital network. Packets are made of a header and a payload. Data in the header is used by networking hardware to direct the packet to its destination, where the payload is extracted and used by an operating system, application software, or higher layer protocols. Packet switching is the primary basis for data communications in computer networks worldwide.

In the early 1960s, American computer scientist Paul Baran developed the concept that he called "distributed adaptive message block switching", with the goal of providing a fault-tolerant, efficient routing method for telecommunication messages as part of a research program at the RAND Corporation, funded by the United States Department of Defense. His ideas contradicted then-established principles of pre-allocation of network bandwidth, exemplified by the development of telecommunications in the Bell System. The new concept found little resonance among network implementers until the independent work of British computer scientist Donald Davies at the National Physical Laboratory in 1965. Davies is credited with coining the modern term packet switching and inspiring numerous packet switching networks in the decade following, including the incorporation of the concept into the design of the ARPANET in the United States. The ARPANET was the primary precursor network of the modern Internet.

Concept

A simple definition of packet switching is:

Packet switching allows delivery of variable bit rate data streams, realized as sequences of packets, over a computer network which allocates transmission resources as needed using statistical multiplexing or dynamic bandwidth allocation techniques. As they traverse networking hardware, such as switches and routers, packets are received, buffered, queued, and retransmitted (stored and forwarded), resulting in variable latency and throughput depending on the link capacity and the traffic load on the network. Packets are normally forwarded by intermediate network nodes asynchronously using first-in, first-out buffering, but may be forwarded according to some scheduling discipline for fair queuing, traffic shaping, or for differentiated or guaranteed quality of service, such as weighted fair queuing or leaky bucket. Packet-based communication may be implemented with or without intermediate forwarding nodes (switches and routers). In case of a shared physical medium (such as radio or 10BASE5), the packets may be delivered according to a multiple access scheme.

Packet switching contrasts with another principal networking paradigm, circuit switching, a method which pre-allocates dedicated network bandwidth specifically for each communication session, each having a constant bit rate and latency between nodes. In cases of billable services, such as cellular communication services, circuit switching is characterized by a fee per unit of connection time, even when no data is transferred, while packet switching may be characterized by a fee per unit of information transmitted, such as characters, packets, or messages.

A packet switch has four components: input ports, output ports, routing processor, and switching fabric.

History

Invention and development 
The concept of switching small blocks of data was first explored independently by Paul Baran at the RAND Corporation in the early 1960s in the US and Donald Davies at the National Physical Laboratory (NPL) in the UK in 1965.

In the late 1950s, the US Air Force established a wide area network for the Semi-Automatic Ground Environment (SAGE) radar defense system. Recognizing vulnerabilities in this network, the Air Force sought a system that might survive a nuclear attack to enable a response, thus diminishing the attractiveness of the first strike advantage by enemies (see Mutual assured destruction). Baran developed the concept of distributed adaptive message block switching in support of the Air Force initiative. The concept was first presented to the Air Force in the summer of 1961 as briefing B-265, later published as RAND report P-2626 in 1962, and finally in report RM 3420 in 1964. Report P-2626 described a general architecture for a large-scale, distributed, survivable communications network. The work focuses on three key ideas: use of a decentralized network with multiple paths between any two points, dividing user messages into message blocks, and delivery of these messages by store and forward switching.

Davies independently developed a similar message routing concept and more detailed network design in 1965. He coined the term packet switching, and proposed building a commercial nationwide data network in the UK. He gave a talk on the proposal in 1966, after which a person from the Ministry of Defence (MoD) told him about Baran's work. Roger Scantlebury, a member of Davies' team met Lawrence Roberts at the 1967 Symposium on Operating Systems Principles and suggested it for use in the ARPANET. Davies had chosen some of the same parameters for his original network design as did Baran, such as a packet size of 1024 bits. In 1966, Davies proposed that a network should be built at the laboratory to serve the needs of NPL and prove the feasibility of packet switching. To deal with packet permutations (due to dynamically updated route preferences) and to datagram losses (unavoidable when fast sources send to a slow destinations), he assumed that "all users of the network will provide themselves with some kind of error control", thus inventing what came to be known the end-to-end principle. After a pilot experiment in 1969, the NPL Data Communications Network entered service in 1970.

Leonard Kleinrock conducted research into the application of queueing theory in the field of message switching for his doctoral dissertation at MIT in 1961-2 and published it as a book in 1964. In 1968, Lawrence Roberts contracted with Kleinrock to carry out theoretical work at UCLA to measure and model the performance of packet switching in the ARPANET, which underpinned the development of the network in the early 1970s. The NPL team also carried out simulation work on packet networks, including datagram networks.

The French CYCLADES network was designed by Louis Pouzin in the early 1970s to study internetworking. It was the first to implement the end-to-end principle of Davies, and make the hosts responsible for the reliable delivery of data on a packet-switched network, rather than this being a service of the network itself. His team was thus first to tackle the highly complex problem of providing user applications with a reliable virtual circuit service while using a best-effort service, an early contribution to what will be Transmission Control Protocol (TCP).

In May 1974, Vint Cerf and Bob Kahn described the Transmission Control Program, an internetworking protocol for sharing resources using packet-switching among the nodes. This monolithic protocol was later layered as the Transmission Control Protocol, TCP, atop the Internet Protocol, IP.

In the late 1970s and early 1980s, national and international public data networks emerged based on the X.25 protocol. X.25 is built on the concept of virtual circuits emulating traditional telephone connections. 

For a period in the late 1980s and early 1990s, the network engineering community was polarized over the implementation of competing protocol suites, commonly known as the Protocol Wars. It was unclear which of the OSI model and the Internet protocol suite would result in the best and most robust computer networks.

Complementary metal–oxide–semiconductor (CMOS) VLSI (very-large-scale integration) technology led to the development of high-speed broadband packet switching during the 1980s1990s.

'Paternity' dispute 
Beginning in the mid-1990s, Leonard Kleinrock sought to be recognized as the "father of modern data networking". However, Kleinrock's claims that his work in the early 1960s originated the concept of packet switching and that this work was the source of the packet switching concepts used in the ARPANET are disputed by other Internet pioneers, including by Robert Taylor, Paul Baran, and Donald Davies. Baran and Davies are recognized by historians and the U.S. National Inventors Hall of Fame for independently inventing the concept of digital packet switching used in modern computer networking including the Internet.

Connectionless and connection-oriented modes
Packet switching may be classified into connectionless packet switching, also known as datagram switching, and connection-oriented packet switching, also known as virtual circuit switching. Examples of connectionless systems are Ethernet, Internet Protocol (IP), and the User Datagram Protocol (UDP). Connection-oriented systems include X.25, Frame Relay, Multiprotocol Label Switching (MPLS), and the Transmission Control Protocol (TCP).

In connectionless mode each packet is labeled with a destination address, source address, and port numbers. It may also be labeled with the sequence number of the packet. This information eliminates the need for a pre-established path to help the packet find its way to its destination, but means that more information is needed in the packet header, which is therefore larger. The packets are routed individually, sometimes taking different paths resulting in out-of-order delivery. At the destination, the original message may be reassembled in the correct order, based on the packet sequence numbers. Thus a virtual circuit carrying a byte stream is provided to the application by a transport layer protocol, although the network only provides a connectionless network layer service.

Connection-oriented transmission requires a setup phase to establish the parameters of communication before any packet is transferred. The signaling protocols used for setup allow the application to specify its requirements and discover link parameters. Acceptable values for service parameters may be negotiated. The packets transferred may include a connection identifier rather than address information and the packet header can be smaller, as it only needs to contain this code and any information, such as length, timestamp, or sequence number, which is different for different packets. In this case, address information is only transferred to each node during the connection setup phase, when the route to the destination is discovered and an entry is added to the switching table in each network node through which the connection passes. When a connection identifier is used, routing a packet requires the node to look up the connection identifier in a table.

Connection-oriented transport layer protocols such as TCP provide a connection-oriented service by using an underlying connectionless network. In this case, the end-to-end principle dictates that the end nodes, not the network itself, are responsible for the connection-oriented behavior.

Packet switching in networks
Packet switching is used to optimize the use of the channel capacity available in digital telecommunication networks, such as computer networks, and minimize the transmission latency (the time it takes for data to pass across the network), and to increase robustness of communication.

Packet switching is used in the Internet and most local area networks. The Internet is implemented by the Internet Protocol Suite using a variety of link layer technologies. For example, Ethernet and Frame Relay are common. Newer mobile phone technologies (e.g., GSM, LTE) also use packet switching. Packet switching is associated with connectionless networking because, in these systems, no connection agreement needs to be established between communicating parties prior to exchanging data.

X.25 is a notable use of packet switching in that, despite being based on packet switching methods, it provides virtual circuits to the user. These virtual circuits carry variable-length packets. In 1978, X.25 provided the first international and commercial packet switching network, the International Packet Switched Service (IPSS). Asynchronous Transfer Mode (ATM) also is a virtual circuit technology, which uses fixed-length cell relay connection oriented packet switching.

Technologies such as Multiprotocol Label Switching (MPLS) and the Resource Reservation Protocol (RSVP) create virtual circuits on top of datagram networks. MPLS and its predecessors, as well as ATM, have been called "fast packet" technologies. MPLS, indeed, has been called "ATM without cells". Virtual circuits are especially useful in building robust failover mechanisms and allocating bandwidth for delay-sensitive applications.

Packet-switched networks

The history of packet-switched networks can be divided into three overlapping eras: early networks before the introduction of X.25; the X.25 era when many postal, telephone, and telegraph (PTT) companies provided public data networks with X.25 interfaces; and the Internet era which initially competed with the OSI model.

Early networks
Research into packet switching at the National Physical Laboratory (NPL) began with a proposal for a wide-area network in 1965, and a local-area network in 1966. ARPANET funding was secured in 1966 by Bob Taylor, and planning began in 1967 when he hired Larry Roberts. The NPL network, ARPANET, and SITA HLN became operational in 1969. 

Before the introduction of X.25 in 1976, about twenty different network technologies had been developed. Two fundamental differences involved the division of functions and tasks between the hosts at the edge of the network and the network core. In the datagram system, operating according to the end-to-end principle, the hosts have the responsibility to ensure orderly delivery of packets. In the virtual call system, the network guarantees sequenced delivery of data to the host. This results in a simpler host interface but complicates the network. The X.25 protocol suite uses this network type.

AppleTalk
AppleTalk is a proprietary suite of networking protocols developed by Apple in 1985 for Apple Macintosh computers. It was the primary protocol used by Apple devices through the 1980s and 1990s. AppleTalk included features that allowed local area networks to be established ad hoc without the requirement for a centralized router or server. The AppleTalk system automatically assigned addresses, updated the distributed namespace, and configured any required inter-network routing. It was a plug-n-play system.

AppleTalk implementations were also released for the IBM PC and compatibles, and the Apple IIGS. AppleTalk support was available in most networked printers, especially laser printers, some file servers and routers. AppleTalk support was terminated in 2009, replaced by TCP/IP protocols.

ARPANET
The ARPANET was a progenitor network of the Internet and one of the first networks, along with ARPA's SATNET, to run the TCP/IP suite using packet switching technologies.

BNRNET
BNRNET was a network which Bell-Northern Research developed for internal use. It initially had only one host but was designed to support many hosts. BNR later made major contributions to the CCITT X.25 project.

Cambridge Ring

The Cambridge Ring was an experimental ring network developed at the Computer Laboratory, University of Cambridge. It operated from 1974 until the 1980s.

CompuServe 
CompuServe developed its own packet switching network, implemented on DEC PDP-11 minicomputers acting as network nodes that were installed throughout the US (and later, in other countries) and interconnected. Over time, the CompuServe network evolved into a complicated multi-tiered network incorporating ATM, Frame Relay, Internet Protocol (IP) and X.25 technologies.

CYCLADES
The CYCLADES packet switching network was a French research network designed and directed by Louis Pouzin. First demonstrated in 1973, it was developed to explore alternatives to the early ARPANET design and to support network research generally. It was the first network to use the end-to-end principle and make the hosts responsible for reliable delivery of data, rather than the network itself. Concepts of this network influenced later ARPANET architecture.

DECnet
DECnet is a suite of network protocols created by Digital Equipment Corporation, originally released in 1975 in order to connect two PDP-11 minicomputers. It evolved into one of the first peer-to-peer network architectures, thus transforming DEC into a networking powerhouse in the 1980s. Initially built with three layers, it later (1982) evolved into a seven-layer OSI-compliant networking protocol. The DECnet protocols were designed entirely by Digital Equipment Corporation. However, DECnet Phase II (and later) were open standards with published specifications, and several implementations were developed outside DEC, including one for Linux.

DDX-1
DDX-1 was an experimental network from Nippon PTT. It mixed circuit switching and packet switching. It was succeeded by DDX-2.

EIN 
The European Informatics Network (EIN), originally called COST 11, was a project beginning in 1971 to link networks in Britain, France, Italy, Switzerland and Euratom. Six other European countries also participated in the research on network protocols. Derek Barber directed the project,and Roger Scantlebury led the UK technical contribution; both were from NPL. The contract for its implementation was awarded to an Anglo French consortium led by the UK systems house Logica and Sesa and managed by Andrew Karney. Work began in 1973 and it became operational in 1976 including nodes linking the NPL network and CYCLADES. The transport protocol of the EIN was the basis of the one adopted by the International Networking Working Group. EIN was replaced by Euronet in 1979.

EPSS
The Experimental Packet Switched Service (EPSS) was an experiment of the UK Post Office Telecommunications. It was the first public data network in the UK when it began operating in 1977. Ferranti supplied the hardware and software. The handling of link control messages (acknowledgements and flow control) was different from that of most other networks.

GEIS
As General Electric Information Services (GEIS), General Electric was a major international provider of information services. The company originally designed a telephone network to serve as its internal (albeit continent-wide) voice telephone network.

In 1965, at the instigation of Warner Sinback, a data network based on this voice-phone network was designed to connect GE's four computer sales and service centers (Schenectady, New York, Chicago, and Phoenix) to facilitate a computer time-sharing service.

After going international some years later, GEIS created a network data center near Cleveland, Ohio. Very little has been published about the internal details of their network. The design was hierarchical with redundant communication links.

IPSANET
IPSANET was a semi-private network constructed by I. P. Sharp Associates to serve their time-sharing customers. It became operational in May 1976.

IPX/SPX
The Internetwork Packet Exchange (IPX) and Sequenced Packet Exchange (SPX) are Novell networking protocols from the 1980s derived from Xerox Network Systems' IDP and SPP protocols, respectively which date back to the 1970s. IPX/SPX was used primarily on networks using the Novell NetWare operating systems.

Merit Network
Merit Network, an independent nonprofit organization governed by Michigan's public universities, was formed in 1966 as the Michigan Educational Research Information Triad to explore computer networking between three of Michigan's public universities as a means to help the state's educational and economic development. With initial support from the State of Michigan and the National Science Foundation (NSF), the packet-switched network was first demonstrated in December 1971 when an interactive host-to-host connection was made between the IBM mainframe systems at the University of Michigan in Ann Arbor and Wayne State University in Detroit. In October 1972, connections to the CDC mainframe at Michigan State University in East Lansing completed the triad. Over the next several years, in addition to host-to-host interactive connections, the network was enhanced to support terminal-to-host connections, host-to-host batch connections (remote job submission, remote printing, batch file transfer), interactive file transfer, gateways to the Tymnet and Telenet public data networks, X.25 host attachments, gateways to X.25 data networks, Ethernet attached hosts, and eventually TCP/IP; additionally, public universities in Michigan joined the network. All of this set the stage for Merit's role in the NSFNET project starting in the mid-1980s.

NPL
In 1965, Donald Davies of the National Physical Laboratory (United Kingdom) designed and proposed a national commercial data network based on packet switching. The proposal was not taken up nationally but, in 1966, he designed a local network using  "interface computers", today known as routers, to serve the needs of NPL and prove the feasibility of packet switching.

By 1968 Davies had begun building the NPL network to meet the needs of the multidisciplinary laboratory and prove the technology under operational conditions. In 1976, 12 computers and 75 terminal devices were attached, and more were added until the network was replaced in 1986. NPL and the ARPANET were the first two networks to use packet switching, and were interconnected in the early 1970s.

Octopus
Octopus was a local network at Lawrence Livermore National Laboratory. It connected sundry hosts at the lab to interactive terminals and various computer peripherals including a bulk storage system.

Philips Research
Philips Research Laboratories in Redhill, Surrey developed a packet switching network for internal use. It was a datagram network with a single switching node.

PUP
PARC Universal Packet (PUP or Pup) was one of the two earliest internetworking protocol suites; it was created by researchers at Xerox PARC in the mid-1970s. The entire suite provided routing and packet delivery, as well as higher level functions such as a reliable byte stream, along with numerous applications. Further developments led to Xerox Network Systems (XNS).

RCP
RCP was an experimental network created by the French PTT. It was used to gain experience with packet switching technology before the specification of TRANSPAC was frozen. RCP was a virtual-circuit network in contrast to CYCLADES which was based on datagrams. RCP emphasised terminal-to-host and terminal-to-terminal connection; CYCLADES was concerned with host-to-host communication. RCP influenced the X.25 specification, which was deployed on TRANSPAC and other public data networks.

RETD
Red Especial de Transmisión de Datos (RETD) was a network developed by Compañía Telefónica Nacional de España. It became operational in 1972 and thus was the first public network.

SCANNET
"The experimental packet-switched Nordic telecommunication network SCANNET was implemented in Nordic technical libraries in the 1970s, and it included first Nordic electronic journal Extemplo. Libraries were also among first ones in universities to accommodate microcomputers for public use in the early 1980s."

SITA HLN
SITA is a consortium of airlines. Its High Level Network (HLN) became operational in 1969 at about the same time as ARPANET. It carried interactive traffic and message-switching traffic. As with many non-academic networks, very little has been published about it.

SRCnet/SERCnet

A number of computer facilities serving the Science Research Council (SRC) community in the United Kingdom developed beginning in the early 1970s. Each had their own star network (ULCC London, UMRCC Manchester, Rutherford Appleton Laboratory). There were also regional networks centred on Bristol (on which work was initiated in the late 1960s) followed in the mid-late 1970s by Edinburgh, the Midlands and Newcastle. These groups of institutions shared resources to provide better computing facilities than could be afforded individually. The networks were each based on one manufacturer's standards and were mutually incompatible and overlapping. In 1981, the SRC was renamed the Science and Engineering Research Council (SERC). In the early 1980s a standardisation and interconnection effort started, hosted on an expansion of the SERCnet research network and based on the Coloured Book protocols, later evolving into JANET.

Systems Network Architecture
Systems Network Architecture (SNA) is IBM's proprietary networking architecture created in 1974. An IBM customer could acquire hardware and software from IBM and lease private lines from a common carrier to construct a private network.

Telenet
Telenet was the first FCC-licensed public data network in the United States. Telenet was incorporated in 1973 and started operations in 1975. It was founded by Bolt Beranek & Newman with Larry Roberts as CEO as a means of making packet switching technology public. Telenet initially used a proprietary virtual connection host interface, but changed the host interface to X.25 and the terminal interface to X.29. It went public in 1979 and was then sold to GTE.

Tymnet
Tymnet was an international data communications network headquartered in San Jose, CA that utilized virtual call packet switched technology and used X.25, SNA/SDLC, BSC and ASCII interfaces to connect host computers (servers) at thousands of large companies, educational institutions, and government agencies. Users typically connected via dial-up connections or dedicated asynchronous serial connections. The business consisted of a large public network that supported dial-up users and a private network business that allowed government agencies and large companies (mostly banks and airlines) to build their own dedicated networks. The private networks were often connected via gateways to the public network to reach locations not on the private network. Tymnet was also connected to dozens of other public networks in the U.S. and internationally via X.25/X.75 gateways.

XNS
Xerox Network Systems (XNS) was a protocol suite promulgated by Xerox, which provided routing and packet delivery, as well as higher level functions such as a reliable stream, and remote procedure calls. It was developed from PARC Universal Packet (PUP).

X.25 era

There were two kinds of X.25 networks. Some such as DATAPAC and TRANSPAC were initially implemented with an X.25 external interface. Some older networks such as TELENET and TYMNET were modified to provide a X.25 host interface in addition to older host connection schemes. DATAPAC was developed by Bell-Northern Research which was a joint venture of Bell Canada (a common carrier) and Northern Telecom (a telecommunications equipment supplier). Northern Telecom sold several DATAPAC clones to foreign PTTs including the Deutsche Bundespost. X.75 and X.121 allowed the interconnection of national X.25 networks. A user or host could call a host on a foreign network by including the DNIC of the remote network as part of the destination address.

AUSTPAC
AUSTPAC was an Australian public X.25 network operated by Telstra. Started by Telecom Australia in the early 1980s, AUSTPAC was Australia's first public packet-switched data network and supported applications such as on-line betting, financial applications—the Australian Tax Office made use of AUSTPAC—and remote terminal access to academic institutions, who maintained their connections to AUSTPAC up until the mid-late 1990s in some cases. Access was via a dial-up terminal to a PAD, or, by linking a permanent X.25 node to the network.

ConnNet
ConnNet was a network operated by the Southern New England Telephone Company serving the state of Connecticut. Launched on March 11, 1985, it was the first local public packet-switched network in the United States.

Datanet 1
Datanet 1 was the public switched data network operated by the Dutch PTT Telecom (now known as KPN). Strictly speaking Datanet 1 only referred to the network and the connected users via leased lines (using the X.121 DNIC 2041), the name also referred to the public PAD service Telepad (using the DNIC 2049). And because the main Videotex service used the network and modified PAD devices as infrastructure the name Datanet 1 was used for these services as well.

DATAPAC
DATAPAC was the first operational X.25 network (1976). It covered major Canadian cities and was eventually extended to smaller centers.

Datex-P
Deutsche Bundespost operated the Datex-P national network in Germany. The technology was acquired from Northern Telecom.

Eirpac 
Eirpac is the Irish public switched data network supporting X.25 and X.28. It was launched in 1984, replacing Euronet. Eirpac is run by Eircom.

Euronet
Nine member states of the European Economic Community contracted with Logica and the French company SESA to set up a joint venture in 1975 to undertake the Euronet development, using X.25 protocols to form virtual circuits. It was to replace EIN and established a network in 1979 linking a number of European countries until 1984 when the network was handed over to national PTTs.

HIPA-NET
Hitachi designed a private network system for sale as a turnkey package to multi-national organizations. In addition to providing X.25 packet switching, message switching software was also included. Messages were buffered at the nodes adjacent to the sending and receiving terminals. Switched virtual calls were not supported, but through the use of logical ports an originating terminal could have a menu of pre-defined destination terminals.

Iberpac
Iberpac is the Spanish public packet-switched network, providing X.25 services. It was based on RETD which was operational since 1972. Iberpac was run by Telefonica.

IPSS
In 1978, X.25 provided the first international and commercial packet-switching network, the International Packet Switched Service (IPSS).

JANET
JANET was the UK academic and research network, linking all universities, higher education establishments, and publicly funded research laboratories following its launch in 1984. The X.25 network, which used the Coloured Book protocols, was based mainly on GEC 4000 series switches, and ran X.25 links at up to 8 Mbit/s in its final phase before being converted to an IP-based network in 1991. The JANET network grew out of the 1970s SRCnet, later called SERCnet.

PSS
Packet Switch Stream (PSS) was the Post Office Telecommunications (later to become British Telecom) national X.25 network with a DNIC of 2342. British Telecom renamed PSS Global Network Service (GNS), but the PSS name has remained better known. PSS also included public dial-up PAD access, and various InterStream gateways to other services such as Telex.

REXPAC 
REXPAC was the nationwide experimental packet switching data network in Brazil, developed by the research and development center of Telebrás, the state-owned public telecommunications provider.

TRANSPAC
TRANSPAC was the national X.25 network in France. It was developed locally at about the same time as DATAPAC in Canada. The development was done by the French PTT and influenced by the experimental RCP network. It began operation in 1978, and served commercial users and, after Minitel began, consumers.

UNINETT 
UNINETT was a wide-area Norwegian packet-switched network established through a joint effort between Norwegian universities, research institutions and the Norwegian Telecommunication administration. The original network was based on X.25; Internet protocols were adopted later.

VENUS-P
VENUS-P was an international X.25 network that operated from April 1982 through March 2006. At its subscription peak in 1999, VENUS-P connected 207 networks in 87 countries.

Venepaq
Venepaq is the national X.25 public network in Venezuela. It is run by Cantv and allows direct and dial-up connections. Venepaq provides nationwide access at low cost.

Internet era

When Internet connectivity was made available to anyone who could pay for an Internet service provider subscription, the distinctions between national networks blurred. The user no longer saw network identifiers such as the DNIC. Some older technologies such as circuit switching have resurfaced with new names such as fast packet switching. Researchers have created some experimental networks to complement the existing Internet.

CSNET
The Computer Science Network (CSNET) was a computer network funded by the NSF that began operation in 1981. Its purpose was to extend networking benefits for computer science departments at academic and research institutions that could not be directly connected to ARPANET due to funding or authorization limitations. It played a significant role in spreading awareness of, and access to, national networking and was a major milestone on the path to the development of the global Internet.

Internet2
Internet2 is a not-for-profit United States computer networking consortium led by members from the research and education communities, industry, and government. The Internet2 community, in partnership with Qwest, built the first Internet2 Network, called Abilene, in 1998 and was a prime investor in the National LambdaRail (NLR) project. In 2006, Internet2 announced a partnership with Level 3 Communications to launch a brand new nationwide network, boosting its capacity from 10 Gbit/s to 100 Gbit/s. In October, 2007, Internet2 officially retired Abilene and now refers to its new, higher capacity network as the Internet2 Network.

NSFNET

The National Science Foundation Network (NSFNET) was a program of coordinated, evolving projects sponsored by the National Science Foundation (NSF) beginning in 1985 to promote advanced research and education networking in the United States. NSFNET was also the name given to several nationwide backbone networks operating at speeds of 56 kbit/s, 1.5 Mbit/s (T1), and 45 Mbit/s (T3) that were constructed to support NSF's networking initiatives from 1985-1995. Initially created to link researchers to the nation's NSF-funded supercomputing centers, through further public funding and private industry partnerships it developed into a major part of the Internet backbone.

NSFNET regional networks
In addition to the five NSF supercomputer centers, NSFNET provided connectivity to eleven regional networks and through these networks to many smaller regional and campus networks in the United States. The NSFNET regional networks were:
BARRNet, the Bay Area Regional Research Network in Palo Alto, California;
CERFNET, California Education and Research Federation Network in San Diego, California, serving California and Nevada;
CICNet, the Committee on Institutional Cooperation Network via the Merit Network in Ann Arbor, Michigan and later as part of the T3 upgrade via Argonne National Laboratory outside of Chicago, serving the Big Ten Universities and the University of Chicago in Illinois, Indiana, Michigan, Minnesota, Ohio, and Wisconsin;
Merit/MichNet in Ann Arbor, Michigan serving Michigan, formed in 1966, still in operation as of 2016;
MIDnet in Lincoln, Nebraska serving Arkansas, Iowa, Kansas, Missouri, Nebraska, Oklahoma, and South Dakota;
NEARNET, the New England Academic and Research Network in Cambridge, Massachusetts, added as part of the upgrade to T3, serving Connecticut, Maine, Massachusetts, New Hampshire, Rhode Island, and Vermont, established in late 1988, operated by BBN under contract to MIT, BBN assumed responsibility for NEARNET on 1 July 1993;
NorthWestNet in Seattle, Washington, serving Alaska, Idaho, Montana, North Dakota, Oregon, and Washington, founded in 1987;
NYSERNet, New York State Education and Research Network in Ithaca, New York;
JVNCNet, the John von Neumann National Supercomputer Center Network in Princeton, New Jersey, serving Delaware and New Jersey;
SESQUINET, the Sesquicentennial Network in Houston, Texas, founded during the 150th anniversary of the State of Texas;
SURAnet, the Southeastern Universities Research Association network in College Park, Maryland and later as part of the T3 upgrade in Atlanta, Georgia serving Alabama, Florida, Georgia, Kentucky, Louisiana, Maryland, Mississippi, North Carolina, South Carolina, Tennessee, Virginia, and West Virginia, sold to BBN in 1994; and
Westnet in Salt Lake City, Utah and Boulder, Colorado, serving Arizona, Colorado, New Mexico, Utah, and Wyoming.

National LambdaRail
The National LambdaRail was launched in September 2003. It is a 12,000-mile high-speed national computer network owned and operated by the U.S. research and education community that runs over fiber-optic lines. It was the first transcontinental 10 Gigabit Ethernet network. It operates with high aggregate capacity of up to 1.6 Tbit/s and a high 40 Gbit/s bitrate, with plans for 100 Gbit/s. The upgrade never took place and NLR ceased operations in March 2014.

TransPAC, TransPAC2, and TransPAC3
TransPAC2 and TransPAC3, continuations of the TransPAC project, a high-speed international Internet service connecting research and education networks in the Asia-Pacific region to those in the US. TransPAC is part of the NSF's International Research Network Connections (IRNC) program.

Very high-speed Backbone Network Service (vBNS)
The Very high-speed Backbone Network Service (vBNS) came on line in April 1995 as part of a National Science Foundation (NSF) sponsored project to provide high-speed interconnection between NSF-sponsored supercomputing centers and select access points in the United States. The network was engineered and operated by MCI Telecommunications under a cooperative agreement with the NSF. By 1998, the vBNS had grown to connect more than 100 universities and research and engineering institutions via 12 national points of presence with DS-3 (45 Mbit/s), OC-3c (155 Mbit/s), and OC-12c (622 Mbit/s) links on an all OC-12c backbone, a substantial engineering feat for that time. The vBNS installed one of the first ever production OC-48c (2.5 Gbit/s) IP links in February 1999 and went on to upgrade the entire backbone to OC-48c.

In June 1999 MCI WorldCom introduced vBNS+ which allowed attachments to the vBNS network by organizations that were not approved by or receiving support from NSF. After the expiration of the NSF agreement, the vBNS largely transitioned to providing service to the government. Most universities and research centers migrated to the Internet2 educational backbone. In January 2006, when MCI and Verizon merged, vBNS+ became a service of Verizon Business.

See also
Multi-bearer network
Optical burst switching
Packet radio
Public switched data network
Transmission delay
Virtual private network

References

Bibliography
Paul Baran et al., On Distributed Communications, Volumes I-XI  (RAND Corporation Research Documents, August, 1964)
Paul Baran, On Distributed Communications: I Introduction to Distributed Communications Network (RAND Memorandum RM-3420-PR. August 1964)
Paul Baran, On Distributed Communications Networks, (IEEE Transactions on Communications Systems, Vol. CS-12 No. 1, pp. 1–9, March 1964)
D. W. Davies, K. A. Bartlett, R. A. Scantlebury, and P. T. Wilkinson, A digital communications network for computers giving rapid response at remote terminals (ACM Symposium on Operating Systems Principles. October 1967)
R. A. Scantlebury, P. T. Wilkinson, and K. A. Bartlett, The design of a message switching Centre for a digital communication network (IFIP 1968)
Lawrence Roberts, The Evolution of Packet Switching (Proceedings of the IEEE, November, 1978)

Further reading

Hafner, Katie Where Wizards Stay Up Late (Simon and Schuster, 1996) pp 52–67
Norberg, Arthur; O'Neill, Judy E. Transforming Computer Technology: Information Processing for the Pentagon, 1962-1982 (Johns Hopkins University, 1996)

External links

Oral history interview with Paul Baran. Charles Babbage Institute University of Minnesota, Minneapolis. Baran describes his working environment at RAND, as well as his initial interest in survivable communications, and the evolution, writing and distribution of his eleven-volume work, "On Distributed Communications". Baran discusses his interaction with the group at ARPA who were responsible for the later development of the ARPANET.
NPL Data Communications Network NPL video, 1970s
Packet Switching History and Design, site reviewed by Baran, Roberts, and Kleinrock
Paul Baran and the Origins of the Internet
20+ articles on packet switching in the 1970s 
"An Introduction to Packet Switched Networks", Phrack, 05/3/88

Computer networking
History of the Internet
Network protocols